Ramshaw is an unincorporated community in Clinton Township, Saint Louis County, Minnesota, United States.

The community is located southwest of Eveleth at the junction of Saint Louis County Road 776 (Old Mesabe Road) and County Road 755 (Ramshaw Road).

Iron Junction is nearby.  Saint Louis County Highway 7 is also in the vicinity.

References

Unincorporated communities in Minnesota
Unincorporated communities in St. Louis County, Minnesota